Sticky (born Richard Forbes) is a UK garage producer. He is best known for his 2001 hit "Booo!" featuring Ms. Dynamite, which peaked at number 12 on the UK Singles Chart and number one on the UK Dance Singles Chart, and for the tracks "Triplets" and "Things We Do" featuring Kele Le Roc (which itself samples "Triplets").

In 1999, Sticky joined DJ/producer Jason Kaye's label Social Circles and has since worked with Kaye on many records, including "Booo!". Kaye is a member of breakbeat hardcore group Top Buzz.

In 2002, Sticky worked with RWD Magazine team members Matt Mason and Lex Johnson to record the theme song and music video to the first grime comedy series commissioned by Channel U, titled The Booo Krooo.

Sticky also produced the chart hit singles "Tales of the Hood" by Tubby T and "Hype! Hype!" by SLK, and has remixed tracks by many artists including Britney Spears, Justin Timberlake, Aaliyah, Sugababes, Hot Chip, Beenie Man, Erykah Badu and Tulisa.

In 2013, Sticky appeared alongside many other garage pioneers in a documentary exploring the legacy of UK garage, Rewind 4Ever: The History of UK Garage.

References

External links

UK garage musicians
DJs from London
English record producers
Black British DJs
Grime music artists
Remixers
Living people
Year of birth missing (living people)
Electronic dance music DJs